The 2000 Irish Greyhound Derby took place during August and September with the final being held at Shelbourne Park in Dublin on 2 September 2000. 

The winner Judicial Pride won £60,000 and was trained by Michael O'Donovan, owned by Pat Daly and bred by Michael Walsh. The race was sponsored for the first time by Paddy Power.

Final result 
At Shelbourne, 2 September (over 550 yards):

Distances 
2½, ¾, 3½, 1¾, 2¼ (lengths)

Competition Report
The 2000 English Greyhound Derby champion Rapid Ranger only just managed to take his place in the first round after the ferry transporting him was late, as a consequence the ante-post favourite only just qualified for the next round after finishing third in his heat. The fastest winner of the first round was Joannestown Cash in 29.92.

In the second round Rapid Ranger bounced back to form recording 29.97, a time nearly matched by English Derby semi-finalist Judicial Pride in 29.98. Greenfield Deal now with Matt Travers recorded 30.13, as did Killiney Kingdom.

In the opening quarter-final Greenfield Deal was fast away from the traps and broke the track record time by finishing in 29.74 (15 spots (0.15 sec) inside Frisby Flashing's former record). Official Leader claimed the second heat before Currie Kid won heat three which contained Rapid Ranger and defending champion Spring Time, the latter failed to progress. Judicial Pride completed the quarter final winners.

Rapid Ranger came good again in the semi-finals catching leader Currie Kid in 29.94, with Miss Tetley taking third place. In the second semi final Judicial Pride was away fast, easing to a seven and a quarter length win and another new track record time of 29.66. Golfing Lad and Ballyhone Cyclone were a distant second and third and Greenfield Deal not only lost his short lived record but failed to make the final.

Judicial Pride did everything right in the final, taking an early lead and then helped by the slow start of Currie Kid on his inside. The fawn dog then completed his unbeaten Derby campaign by crossing the line in a very fast 29.68, Rapid Ranger had a poor trap five draw and ran on well to take the runner-up spot.

Quarter finals

Semi finals

See also
2000 UK & Ireland Greyhound Racing Year

References

Greyhound Derby
Irish Greyhound Derby
Irish Greyhound Derby